Elliott Hord (born August 13, 1991) is an American soccer player.

Career 
He signed for Sacramento Republic FC from Fresno Fuego in August 2016.

He made his professional debut versus Orange County Blues in August 2016 during the 2016 USL season.

On August 17, 2019, Hord was loaned to USL side Hartford Athletic for the remainder of the season.

References 

1991 births
Living people
American soccer players
Association football defenders
Fresno Fuego players
Sacramento Republic FC players
Hartford Athletic players
Soccer players from California
Sportspeople from Fresno, California
UC Davis Aggies men's soccer players
USL Championship players
USL League Two players